El Jefe (f. La Jefa) is a Spanish term meaning "the chief" or "the boss" and may refer to:
 "El Jefe", a less-common nickname for former Cuban President Fidel Castro (deriving from his title as Comandante en Jefe or "Commander-in-Chief" of the Cuban Armed Forces)
 "El Jefe" (Daddy Yankee song), intro track to Daddy Yankee's 2007 album El Cartel: The Big Boss
 El Hefe (born 1965), guitar player for the punk band NOFX, who derives his nickname from El Jefe
 Rafael Trujillo (1891–1961), former dictator of the Dominican Republic, nicknamed "El Jefe"
 El Jefe, one of the few wild jaguars that was reported in the United States
 "Jefe", a character from Three Amigos, a 1986 film, played by Tony Plana